Autodesk Softimage, or simply Softimage was a 3D computer graphics application, for producing 3D computer graphics, 3D modeling, and computer animation. Now owned by Autodesk and formerly titled Softimage|XSI, the software has been predominantly used in the film, video game, and advertising industries for creating computer generated characters, objects, and environments.

Released in 2000 as the successor to Softimage3D, Softimage|XSI was developed by its eponymous company, then a subsidiary of Avid Technology. On October 23, 2008, Autodesk acquired the Softimage brand and 3D animation assets from Avid for approximately $35 million, thereby ending Softimage Co. as a distinct entity.  In February 2009, Softimage|XSI was rebranded Autodesk Softimage.

A free version of the software, called Softimage Mod Tool, was developed for the game modding community to create games using the Microsoft XNA toolset for PC and Xbox 360, or to create mods for games using Valve's Source engine, Epic Games's Unreal Engine and others. It was discontinued with the release of Softimage 2014.

On March 4, 2014, it was announced that Autodesk Softimage would be discontinued after the release of the 2015 version, providing product support until April 30, 2016.

Overview
Autodesk Softimage is a 3D animation application comprising a suite of computer graphics tools.

Modeling tools allow the generation of polygonal or NURBS models. Subdivision modeling requires no additional operators and works directly on the polygonal geometry. Each modeling operation is tracked by a construction history stack, which enables artists to work non-destructively. Operators in history stacks can be re-ordered, removed or changed at any time, and all adjustments propagate to the final model.

Control rigs are created using bones with automatic IK, constraints and specialized solvers like spine or tail. Optionally, the ICE system can be used to create light-weight rigs in a node-based environment. The rigging process can be sped up through the use of adaptable biped and quadruped rigs, FaceRobot for facial rigs and automatic lip syncing.

Animation features include layers and a mixer, which allows combining animation clips non-linearly. Animation operators are tracked in a construction history stack that is separate from the modeling stack, enabling users to change the underlying geometry of already animated characters and objects. MOTOR is a feature that transfers animation between characters, regardless of their size or proportions. GATOR can transfer attributes such as textures, UVs, weight maps or envelopes between different models. Softimage also contains tools to simulate particles, particle strands, rigid body dynamics, soft body dynamics, cloth, hair and fluids.

The default and tightly integrated rendering engine in Softimage is mental ray. Materials and shaders are built in a node-based fashion. When users activate a so-called render region in a camera view, it will render this section of the scene using the specified rendering engine and update completely interactively. A secondary rendering mode is available for rendering real-time GPU shaders written in either the Cg or HLSL languages.

Also included is the FX Tree, which is a built-in node-based compositor that has direct access to image clips used in the scene. It can thus not only be used to finalize and composite rendered frames, but also as an integral part of scene creation. The FX Tree can be used to apply compositing effects to image clips being used in the fully rendered scene, allowing Softimage to render scenes using textures authored or modified in various ways within the same scene.

In addition to the node-based ICE platform described below, Softimage has an extensive API and scripting environment that can be used to extend the software. The available scripting languages include C#, Python, VBScript and JScript. A C++ SDK is also available for plug-in developers, with online documentation available to the public.

ICE Interactive Creative Environment

On July 7, 2008, the Softimage, Co. announced Softimage|XSI 7,  which introduced the ICE (Interactive Creative Environment) architecture. ICE is a visual programming platform that allows users to extend the capabilities of Softimage quickly and intuitively using a node-based dataflow diagram. This enables artists to create complex 3D effects and tools without scripting. Among the main uses for ICE are procedural modeling, deformation, rigging and particle simulation. It can also be used to control scene attributes without the need to write expressions, for example to add camera wiggle or make a light pulsate. ICE is a parallel processing engine that takes advantage of multi-core CPUs, giving users highly scalable performance.

ICE represents Softimage functionality using a collection of nodes, each with its own specific capabilities. Users can connect nodes together, visually representing the data flow, to create powerful tools and effects. Softimage ships with several hundred nodes; among them are both low level nodes, such as Multiply or Boolean, as well as a number of high level nodes called compounds. Compounds serve as "wrapper nodes" to collapse ICE graphs into a single node. Softimage allows users to add custom compounds to its main menu system for easy reusability.

The screenshot on the right shows an example of a simple geometry deformation ICE graph. In a practical scenario, one would collapse the graph into a compound and expose important parameters, for instance the deformation intensity. After adding the tool to the user interface it can easily be applied to other objects. Compounds can also be shared between installations because their entire functionality is stored in XML files.

The graph-based approach of ICE allows for the creation of effects previously attainable only through the use of scripting and/or compiled code. Due to its visual nature and interactivity, it is very accessible for users with no programming experience. Many free and commercial ICE tools have been made available by users and 3rd party developers. Softimage contains an ICE-based fluid and physics simulator called Lagoa as well as an ICE-based version of the Syflex cloth simulator.

Industry usage
Softimage was primarily used in the film, video game and advertising industries as a tool to generate digital characters, environments and visual effects. Examples of films and other media made with the help of Softimage are Jurassic Park, Thor, Predators, District 9, White House Down, Yakuza, and Elysium.

Releases
 Autodesk Softimage 2015 released April 14, 2014
 Autodesk Softimage 2014 released April 12, 2013
 Autodesk Softimage 2013 released April 12, 2012
 Autodesk Softimage 2012 SAP (Subscription Advantage Pack) released September 27, 2011
 Autodesk Softimage 2012 released April 7, 2011
 Autodesk Softimage 2011 SAP (Subscription Advantage Pack) released October 7, 2010
 Autodesk Softimage 2011 released April 9, 2010
 Autodesk Softimage 2010 released September 14, 2009
 Autodesk Softimage 7.5 released February 20, 2009

References

External links
 
 Softimage Mod Tool

Autodesk discontinued products
3D computer graphics software for Linux
3D graphics software
3D animation software
Discontinued software
IRIX software
Proprietary commercial software for Linux
2000 software